George IV (1762–1830) was King of the United Kingdom of Great Britain and Ireland and of Hanover from 1820 to 1830.

George IV or 4 may refer to:

People
 George IV of Georgia (1192–1223)
 George IV of Guria (died 1726)
 Jorge IV, Archbishop of Braga, see Roman Catholic Archdiocese of Braga
 Georg IV, Abbot of Kaisheim, see Kaisheim Abbey

Other uses
 George IV, Brixton, a former public house on Brixton Hill in south London
 GEORGE 4, version of GEORGE computer operating system
 George IV Bridge, Edinburgh, Scotland, UK; an elevated street
 George IV State Diadem, part of the British Crown Jewels

See also
 George VI (disambiguation) or George 6
 King George (disambiguation)